Sheldon I. Pollock (born 1948) is an American scholar of Sanskrit, the intellectual and literary history of India, and comparative intellectual history. He is the Arvind Raghunathan Professor of South Asian Studies at Columbia University. He was the general editor of the Clay Sanskrit Library and the founding editor of the Murty Classical Library of India.

Education 
Sheldon Pollock was educated at Harvard University. He completed an undergraduate degree in Greek Classics magna cum laude in 1971 and then a Masters in 1973. This was followed by a Ph.D. in 1975 in Sanskrit and Indian Studies.

Occupations 

Before his current position at Columbia University, Pollock was a professor at the University of Iowa and the George V. Bobrinskoy Professor of Sanskrit and Indic Studies at the University of Chicago.

He directed the project Sanskrit Knowledge Systems on the Eve of Colonialism, in which a number of non-Indian scholars (including Pollock, Yigal Bronner, Lawrence McCrea, Christopher Minkowski, Karin Preisendanz, and Dominik Wujastyk) examine the state of knowledge produced in Sanskrit before colonialism. He is also editing a series of Historical Sourcebooks in Classical Indian Thought, to which he has contributed A Rasa Reader: Classical Indian Aesthetics.

He was general editor of the Clay Sanskrit Library and is founding editor of the Murty Classical Library of India. He also served on the Humanities Jury for the Infosys Prize in 2012.

Scholarship 
Pollock's research focuses on the history and interpretation of Sanskrit texts. He completed his dissertation, "Aspects of Versification in Sanskrit Lyric Poetry", at Harvard University under Daniel H. H. Ingalls. Much of his work, including his 2006 book The Language of the Gods in the World of Men, discusses the different roles that Sanskrit has played in intellectual and cultural life throughout its history.

Deep Orientalism? (1993)
According to Pollock's Deep Orientalism? (1993), European indologists and the British colonialists merely propagated the pre-existing oppressive structures inherent in Sanskrit such as varna. Pollock labels the Varnas not as cognates for the European social categories known as Estates, but as pre-existing oppressive structures, which he finds revealed in Sanskrit text as "pre-orientalist orientalism", "pre-colonial orientalism" and "a preform of orientalism".

According to Pollock, "Sanskrit was the principal discursive instrument of domination in premodern India."  According to Wilhelm Halbfass, Pollock postulates an inherent relationship between the hegemonic role of Sanskrit in traditional India and its students among British colonialists or German National Socialists.

Pollock believes that the previous "Eurocentrism" and "European epistemological hegemony" prevented scholars "from probing central features of South Asian life". According to Pollock, "One task of post-orientalist Indology has to be to exhume, isolate, analyze, theorize, and at the very least talk about the different modalities of domination in traditional India."

Rāmāyaṇa 
Pollock was part of the "Rāmāyaṇa Translation Consortion" led by Robert Goldman, which produced an annotated translation of the critical edition of the entire Rāmāyaṇa, published by Princeton University Press. Pollock contributed translations of the Ayodhyākāṇḍa (1986) and the Araṇyakāṇḍa (1991), as well as a note on the critical edition of the Rāmāyaṇa published in the first volume of the Princeton translation and several articles on the textual criticism and interpretation of the poem. These studies include The Divine King in the Indian Epic, which examines the divinity of Rāma in the Vālmīki Rāmāyaṇa and its political implications.

In Ramayana and Political Imagination in India (1993), written against the backdrop of the demolition of the Babri Masjid and attendant sectarian violence in Ayodhya, Pollock seeks to explain how the Ramayana, a text commonly viewed as a "narrative of the divine presence" in the world could serve as a basis for a divisive contemporary political discourse. He asserts that there is a long history of relationship between the Ramayana and political symbology, with the protagonist, Rama depicted as the "chief of the righteous", and Ravana, in opposition, as the one "who fills all the world with terror". Pollock calls the Ramayana fundamentally a text of "othering" as outsiders in the epic are "othered" by being represented as sexual, dietetical, and political deviants. Ravana, is not only "other" due to his polygyny but is presented as a tyrant. Similarly, he states that the rakshasas (demons) of the poem can be viewed from a psychosexual perspective to symbolise all that the traditional Sanskritic Indian might desire and fear. He contrasts the othering in the Ramayana with the Mahabharata which not only has no othering, but in fact has "brothering" due to the shared identity of the antagonists.

A "dramatic and unparalleled" turn came about in the eleventh to fourteenth centuries, a time when the Muslim Turkic rule took hold in India, with Ramayana taking a central place in the public political discourse. He notes the specific meaning-conjuncture in the depiction of the Gurjara-Pratihara founder Nagabhata I as the sage Narayana that "shone with four arms with glittering terrible weapons". To Pollock, Ramayana offers "special imaginative resources", of divinization and demonization. Valmiki's solution to the political paradox of epic India is the "divinized king" who combats evil in the form of a 'demonized others'. Later medieval commentaries of Valmiki's Ramayana include instances where the Muslim outsiders are cast as rakshasas and asuras, and in the case of a Mughal translation of the epic, of Akbar being projected as the divine king, Rama and divs as the rakshasas. Pollock conjectures that this recurrent "mythopolitical strategy" of using the Ramayana as a political instrument has also found favour in modern India in the Ayodhya dispute. This, he posits, is clear not only in the choice of Ayodhya, the traditional birthplace of Rama, but also in the attempts by the BJP and VHP to portray Muslims as demonic.

The Death of Sanskrit (2001) and Rajiv Malhotra 
Pollock begins his 2001 paper The Death of Sanskrit by associating Sanskrit with Hindutva (Hindu identity politics), the Bharatiya Janata Party, and the Vishva Hindu Parishad.

Pollock writes, "...most observers would agree that, in some crucial way, Sanskrit is dead", and postulates how Sanskrit might have reached such an impasse. Observing changes in the use of Sanskrit in 12th-century Kashmir, 16th-century Vijayanagara, and 17th-century Varanasi, Pollock argued that Sanskrit came to serve the purposes of "reinscription and restatement", while truly creative energies were directed elsewhere.

According to Indian-American Hindu revivalist author Rajiv Malhotra, Pollock devised a novel idea about the "literarization" of Sanskrit, wherein the language "gets endowed with certain structures that make it an elite language of power over the masses". Moreover, in his book The Battle for Sanskrit, Malhotra suggests that Pollock makes deliberate, Hinduphobic attempts to de-sanctify Sanskrit.

The Language of the Gods in the World of Men (2006)

The Sanskrit Cosmopolis 
In his 2006 book The Language of the Gods in the World of Men, Pollock posits "the scholarly cultivation of language in premodern India" should be seen in terms of "its relationship to political power". Although Sanskrit was a language of Vedic ritual, it was adopted by royal courts, and by the fifth century "power in India now had a Sanskrit voice". According to Pollock, "Sanskrit become the premier vehicle for the expression of royal will, displacing all other codes" and "Sanskrit learning itself became an essential component of power." Pollock believes that grammar was linked to power, stating "the main point should be clear: that power's concern with grammar, and to a comparable degree grammar's concern with power, comprised a constitutive feature of the Sanskrit cosmopolitan order." Pollock states, "overlords were keen to ensure the cultivation of the language through patronage awarded to grammarians, lexicographers, metricians, and other custodians of purity, and through endowments to schools for the purpose of grammatical studies."  Pollock links the varna of Sanskrit grammar (which means language sounds) to the varna of social order.

The vernacular millennium 
Pollock has argued that, in the Sanskrit cosmopolis, vernacular languages were largely excluded from doing the kind of political-cultural "work" that Sanskrit did. Gradually, however, a process of "vernacularization" resulted in certain vernacular languages being cultivated in much the same way as Sanskrit. Pollock has argued that "vernacularization" has generally involved two steps: first, the use of a written form of the vernacular in "everyday" contexts, such as recording names in inscriptions, which Pollock calls "literalization", and second, the use of the written form of the vernacular in more imaginative contexts, such as writing poetry, which Pollock calls "literarization". Literarization has often involved the creative adaptation of models from "superposed cultural formations", and in South Asia this has largely meant using Sanskrit models. Pollock has focused on Kannada as a case study in vernacularization in South Asia, and has reflected on the vernacularization of Europe as a parallel instance.

Lack of a singular Indian culture 
Pollock believes there never was a singular Indian culture. Pollock states:

Pollock believes the idea of "a single Indian 'peoplehood' (janata)" present in the name of the Bharatiya Janata Party is a modern invention:

Critical philology to transcend Sanskrit's "toxicity" 
Pollock has written about the history and current state of philology, both inside India and outside. In Indian Philology and India's Philology (2011) he defines this current state as "the practices of making sense of texts". In Future Philology? (2009) he has called for practising a "critical philology" which is sensitive to different kinds of truths: the facts of a text's production and circulation, and the various ways in which texts have been interpreted throughout history. In Crisis in the Classics (2011) Pollock states that, once the "toxicity", "extraordinary inequality" and "social poisons" of Sanskrit are acknowledged, critical philology can be used to transcend inequality and transform the dominant culture by "outsmarting" the oppressive discourse through study and analysis.

In the introduction to World Philology (2015) he has also drawn attention to the diversity and longevity of philological traditions in the world and argued for studying them comparatively.

Aesthetics 
Pollock has published on issues related to the history of aesthetics in India, and in particular on the paradigm shift from a "formalist" analysis of emotion (rasa) in literary texts to a more "reader-centered" analysis in the (lost) works of the 9th/10th-century theorist Bhaṭṭa Nāyaka.

Ambedkar Sanskrit Fellowship Program
In 2011 the Ambedkar Sanskrit Fellowship Program started at Columbia, offering a fellowship for one person to pursue a master's degree in Sanskrit. Pollock hopes that this eventually will result in a PhD. Pollock believes that "learning Sanskrit will empower the oppressed by helping them understand the sources and building blocks of the ideology of oppression, as well as its arbitrary nature."

Reception

Hegemonic role of Sanskrit 
According to Jessica Frazier, Pollock points "an accusatory finger at the language, highlighting its function as a purveyor of forms of authority that are culturally and ethnically exclusive, benefiting the few at the expense of the many". According to Frazier, Pollock shows how texts can function to support and spread forms of authority which exclude specific cultural and ethnic subgroups, thereby benefiting small groups within society, at the expense of other groups.

According to Frazier, Pollock has been "contributing to the hermeneutics of suspicion that has become influential in Hindu Studies". "Hermeneutics of suspicion" is a phrase coined by Paul Ricœur, "to capture a common spirit that pervades the writings of Marx, Freud, and Nietzsche". According to Rita Felski, it is "a distinctively modern style of interpretation that circumvents obvious or self-evident meanings in order to draw out less visible and less flattering truths. Ruthellen Josselson explains that "Ricoeur distinguishes between two forms of hermeneutics: a hermeneutics of faith which aims to restore meaning to a text and a hermeneutics of suspicion which attempts to decode meanings that are disguised."

According to David Peter Lawrence, Pollock characterizes Shastras, including philosophical works, as efforts to eternally enshrine the interests and cultural practices of sections of pre-modern India.

The death of Sanskrit
Scholars have reacted to Pollock's claim that Sanskrit is dead. Jürgen Hanneder states that Pollock's argumentation is "often arbitrary". Hanneder states "Pollock has overinterpreted the evidence to support his theory, perhaps in his understandable anger over current nationalistic statements about Sanskrit and indeed new attempts at resanskritization – processes that should perhaps be analysed a few decades later from a distance." Hanneder says that Sanskrit is not a "dead language in the most common usage of the term", since it is still "spoken, written and read", and has emphasized the continuous production of creative literature in Sanskrit up to the present day. Others, including Pollock himself, have emphasized the new creative and intellectual projects that Sanskrit was a part of in early modernity, such as Nīlakaṇṭha Caturdhara's commentary on the Mahābhārata and the development of sophisticated forms of logical analysis (navyanyāya).

National Socialist Indology
Reinhold Grünendahl takes a critical stance towards Pollock's characterisation of German pre-war Indology as "a state-funded Aryanist think-tank, set up to create an Indo-German 'counter-identity to Semite', and simultaneously preparing the 'scientific' basis for racial antisemitism". According to Grunendahl, Pollock's new American school of Indology is "post-Orientalist messianism", commenting that Pollock's self-described "Indology beyond the Raj and Auschwitz" leads to "the 'New Raj' across the deep blue sea".

Petition to remove Pollock from Murty Classical Library 
A petition initiated by Indian scholars demanded that Pollock be removed from the editorship of the Murty Classical Library of India, an initiative that publishes classical literary works from India. The petitioners are believed to belong to the "network of trust" created by Rajiv Malhotra's book, The Battle for Sanskrit.
In a review with the Indian Express, Sheldon Pollock said that negative reception of his work from Hindu activists started because of the JNU student agitation protest petition that he signed. He also clarified that he is a scholar and does not do religious things, saying "I never write on Hinduism. I've never used the word Hinduism." Additionally, he acknowledged that with regards to his essay on The Ramayana, he was to some degree insensitive to the fact that the Ramayana has a life in the hearts of the Indian people, and he is still trying to learn. However, he also said "I write what I think is correct and deal with the consequences. It's difficult to debate with people whose behavior is marked with toxicity, vituperation, deceit, and libel", in reference to the organized campaign to remove him from general editorship of the Murty Classical Library of India.

Rohan Murty, the founder of the library, stated that Sheldon Pollock will continue his position, saying that the library will commission the best possible scholar for that particular language.

Selected publications 

His publications cluster around the Rāmāyaṇa, the philosophical tradition of Mīmāṃsā (scriptural hermeneutics), and recently, the theory of rasa (aesthetic emotion). Pollock directed the Literary Cultures in History project, which culminated in a book of the same title.

Monographs 

 The Language of the Gods in the World of Men: Sanskrit, Culture and Power in Premodern India. Berkeley: University of California Press, 2006.
 Aspects of Versification in Sanskrit Lyric Poetry. New Haven: American Oriental Society, 1977.

Edited volumes 

World Philology (with B. A. Elman and K. Chang). Cambridge, Mass.: Harvard University Press, 2015.
 Forms of Knowledge in Early Modern Asia: Explorations in the Intellectual History of India and Tibet, 1500–1800. Durham: Duke University Press, 2011.
 Bhānudatta, "Bouquet of Rasa" and "River of Rasa". Translated & co-edited by Pollock, with I. Onians. New York: NYU Press, JJC Foundation, 2009.
 Literary Cultures in History: Reconstructions from South Asia. Berkeley: University of California Press, 2003.

Translations 

 Rama's Last Act (Uttararāmacarita) of Bhavabhūti. New York: New York University Press, 2007. (Clay Sanskrit Library.)
 The Bouquet of Rasa and the River of Rasa (Rasamañjarī and Rasataraṅgiṇī) of Bhānudatta. New York: New York University Press, 2009. (Clay Sanskrit Library)
 The Rāmāyaṇa of Vālmīki, An Epic of Ancient India, Vol. III: Araṇyakāṇḍa. Princeton: Princeton University Press, 1991.
 The Rāmāyaṇa of Vālmīki, An Epic of Ancient India, Vol. II: Ayodhyākāṇḍa. Princeton: Princeton University Press, 1986.
A Rasa Reader: Classical Indian Aesthetics, Historical Sourcebooks in Classical Indian Thought series, Columbia University Press, 2016

Articles and book chapters 

 'From Rasa Seen to Rasa Heard.' In Caterina Guenzi and Sylvia d'Intino, eds. Aux abords de la clairière. Paris: Brepols, 2012, pp. 189–207.
 'Review Article: Indian Philology and India's Philology.' Journal Asiatique volume 299, number 1 (2011), pp. 423–475.
 'Comparison without Hegemony.' In Barbro Klein and Hans Joas, eds. The Benefit of Broad Horizons: Intellectual and Institutional Preconditions for a Global Social Science. Festschrift for Bjorn Wittrock on the Occasion of his 65th Birthday. Leiden: Brill, 2010, pp. 185–204.
 'What was Bhaṭṭa Nāyaka Saying? The Hermeneutical Transformation of Indian Aesthetics.' In Sheldon Pollock, ed. Epic and Argument in Sanskrit Literary History: Essays in Honor of Robert P. Goldman. Delhi: Manohar, 2010, pp. 143–184.
 'Future Philology? The Fate of a Soft Science in a Hard World.' In James Chandler and Arnold Davidson, eds. The Fate of the Disciplines. Special number of Critical Inquiry volume 35, number 4 (Summer 2009): 931–961.

Awards 

 In 2010 Pranab Mukherjee, the President of India, awarded Pollock the Padma Shri, the fourth highest civilian honor in the Republic of India, for his distinguished service in the field of letters.
 Pollock has received the Andrew W. Mellon Distinguished Achievement Award.
 In 2011, Yigal Bronner, Whitney Cox, and Lawrence McCrea published a collection of essays by Pollock's students and colleagues, titled South Asian Texts in History: Critical Engagements with Sheldon Pollock.

See also 
 Wendy Doniger
 Alf Hiltebeitel
 David Dean Shulman

Notes

References

Sources

External links 

 
 
 

 Personal and institutional webpages
 Personal webpage, with full bibliography
 Pollock's faculty webpage at Columbia University, including a bibliography of selected works

 Research
 Sanskrit Knowledge Systems on the Eve of Colonialism
 SARIT: Enriching Digital Collections in Indology

 Libraries
 Murty Classical Library of India
 Clay Sanskrit Library 
 South Asia Across The Disciplines

 Interviews
 Glimpse into Sanskrit literary culture, Sunday Observer (2011)
 Mind Your (Ancient) Language, The Indian Express (2015)

Living people
Linguists from the United States
American Indologists
Harvard University alumni
University of Iowa faculty
University of Chicago faculty
Columbia University faculty
Recipients of the Padma Shri in literature & education
American Sanskrit scholars
Translators of the Ramayana
Sanskrit–English translators
1948 births
Hindutva harassment of scholars